Teboho Mokgalagadi is a Paralympian athlete from South Africa competing mainly in category T35 sprint events.

He competed in the 2004 Summer Paralympics in Athens, Greece.  There he won a gold medal in the men's 100 metres – T35 event, a gold medal in the men's 200 metres – T35 event and finished fourth in the men's 4 x 100 metre relay – T35-38 event.  He also competed at the 2008 Summer Paralympics in Beijing, China.   and a bronze medal in the men's 100 metres – T35 event. At the 2012 Summer Olympics in London, he won a Silver medal in the men's 100m – T35 and came 5th in the 200m – T35.

External links 
 

Year of birth missing (living people)
Living people
Paralympic athletes of South Africa
Athletes (track and field) at the 2004 Summer Paralympics
Athletes (track and field) at the 2008 Summer Paralympics
Paralympic gold medalists for South Africa
Paralympic bronze medalists for South Africa
Athletes (track and field) at the 2012 Summer Paralympics
Recipients of the Order of Ikhamanga
Medalists at the 2004 Summer Paralympics
Medalists at the 2008 Summer Paralympics
Medalists at the 2012 Summer Paralympics
Paralympic medalists in athletics (track and field)
South African male sprinters
20th-century South African people
21st-century South African people